Werner Spring (27 March 1917 – 1959) was a Swiss bobsledder who competed in the late 1940s and the early 1950s. He won two bronze medals at the FIBT World Championships with one in the two-man event (1951) and the other in the four-man event (1949).

Spring also competed in two Winter Olympics, earning his best finish of fourth in both the two-man and four man events at Oslo in 1952.

Spring died in Zug, Switzerland, in 1959.

References
Bobsleigh two-man world championship medalists since 1931
Bobsleigh four-man world championship medalists since 1930
Wallechinsky, David (1984). "Bobsled". In The Complete Book of the Olympics: 1896-1980. New York: Penguin Books. pp. 558, 560-1.
Werner Spring's profile at Sports Reference.com

External links
  

Bobsledders at the 1948 Winter Olympics
Bobsledders at the 1952 Winter Olympics
Swiss male bobsledders
1917 births
1959 deaths
20th-century Swiss people